Stalhille is a village in the Belgian province West Flanders in Jabbeke, a municipality in Belgium. The village is located in the northern part of Jabbeke, north of the canal Brugge-Oostende.

History
The name "stal-hille" means corrals and cattle on a hill. After marine transgressions in the early Middle Ages the higher located parts of Stalhille were more suitable to build houses and corrals.

External links
Stalhille @ City Review

Populated places in West Flanders